Erula (Gallurese: Èrula) is a comune (municipality) in the Province of Sassari in the Italian region Sardinia, located about  north of Cagliari and about  east of Sassari.

The municipality of Erula contains the frazioni (subdivisions, mainly villages and hamlets) Sa Mela and Tettile.

Erula borders the following municipalities: Chiaramonti, Ozieri, Perfugas, Tempio Pausania, Tula.

Demographic evolution

References 

Cities and towns in Sardinia
1988 establishments in Italy
States and territories established in 1988